Paul Haba (born 14 July 1959) is a Guinean sprinter. He competed in the men's 100 metres at the 1980 Summer Olympics. Haba competed in heat 8 finishing 6th out of 7 runners, he ran the distance in 11.19 seconds, he failed to qualify for the next round.

Haba's personal best in the 100m is 10.90 seconds set in 1984.

References

1959 births
Living people
Athletes (track and field) at the 1980 Summer Olympics
Guinean male sprinters
Olympic athletes of Guinea
Place of birth missing (living people)